Corbicula is a genus of freshwater and brackish water clams, aquatic bivalve mollusks in the family Cyrenidae, the basket clams. The genus name is the New Latin diminutive of Latin corbis, a basket, referring to the shape and ribs of the shell. 

The genus Corbicula includes numerous extant and fossil species; the status of several of them is unclear (species inquirenda).  The best known is Corbicula fluminea, an invasive species in many areas of the world.

Unusually, some members produce via androgenesis, wherein all genes are inherited from the male, one of the very few animals to do so.

In many Asian countries, these clams are used as ingredients for soup. In South Korea, there is popular soup made of these species of clams (usually Corbicula japonica, Corbicula fluminea, Corbicula leana) known as 재첩국 (jaechup-guk).

Species
Extant species within the genus Corbicula include:

 Corbicula africana (Krauss, 1848)
 Corbicula angulifera E. von Martens, 1897
 Corbicula anomioides (Bogan & Bouchet, 1998)
 Corbicula astartina (E. von Martens, 1860)
 Corbicula aurea Nesemann & G. Sharma, 2007
 Corbicula australis (Deshayes, 1830)
 Corbicula baudoni Morlet, 1886
 Corbicula bitruncata E. von Martens, 1908
 Corbicula blandiana Prime, 1864
 Corbicula bocourti (Morelet, 1865)
 Corbicula cashmiriensis Deshayes, 1855
 Corbicula castanea (Morelet, 1865)
 Corbicula consularis Prime, 1870
 Corbicula cyreniformis Prime, 1860
 Corbicula dautzenbergi Prashad, 1928
 Corbicula elatior E. von Martens, 1905
 Corbicula elongata Clessin, 1878
 Corbicula erosa Prime, 1861
 Corbicula ferghanensis Kursalova & Starobogatov, 1971
 Corbicula fluminalis (O. F. Müller, 1774) 
 Corbicula fluminea (O. F. Müller, 1774) – Asian clam 
 Corbicula formosana Dall, 1903
 Corbicula gabonensis Preston, 1909
 Corbicula gustaviana E. von Martens, 1900
 Corbicula iravadica Blanford, 1880
 Corbicula japonica Prime, 1864
 Corbicula javanica (Mousson, 1849)
 Corbicula lamarckiana Prime, 1864
 Corbicula largillierti (Philippi, 1844)
 Corbicula larnaudieri Prime, 1862
 Corbicula leana (Prime, 1864)
 Corbicula leviuscula Prime, 1864
 Corbicula loehensis Kruimel, 1913
 Corbicula lutea Morelet, 1862
 Corbicula lydigiana Prime, 1861
 Corbicula madagascariensis Smith, 1882
 Corbicula mahalonensis Kruimel, 1913
 Corbicula malaccensis Deshayes, 1855
 Corbicula manilensis (Philippi, 1844)
 Corbicula maroubra (Iredale, 1943)
 Corbicula masapensis Kruimel, 1913
 Corbicula matannensis Sarasin & Sarasin, 1898
 Corbicula messageri Bavay & Dautzenberg, 1901
 Corbicula moltkiana Prime, 1878
 Corbicula moreletiana Prime, 1867
 Corbicula mortoni M. Huber, 2015
 Corbicula nitens (Philippi, 1844)
 Corbicula noetlingi E. von Martens, 1899
 Corbicula ovalina Deshayes, 1855
 Corbicula poppei Thach & F. Huber, 2021
 Corbicula possoensis Sarasin & Sarasin, 1898
 Corbicula pulchella (Mousson, 1849)
 Corbicula pullata (Philippi, 1850)
 Corbicula rectipatula B.-Y. Huang, 1981
 Corbicula regia Clessin, 1879
 Corbicula rivalis (Philippi, 1850)
 Corbicula sandai Reinchardt, 1878
 Corbicula senegalensis Clessin, 1877
 Corbicula siamensis Prashad, 1928
 Corbicula similis (W. Wood, 1828)
 Corbicula solida Clessin, 1887
 Corbicula solidula Prime, 1861
 Corbicula straminea Reinhardt, 1877
 Corbicula striatella Deshayes, 1855
 Corbicula subnitens Clessin, 1887
 Corbicula subplanata E. von Martens, 1897
 Corbicula tenuis Clessin, 1887
 Corbicula tibetensis Prashad, 1929
 Corbicula tobae E. von Martens, 1900
 Corbicula towutensis Kruimel, 1913
 Corbicula tsadiana E. von Martens, 1903
 Corbicula virescens Brandt, 1974

References

 Bogan, A., Bouchet, P. (1998). Cementation in the freshwater bivalve family Corbiculidae (Mollusca: Bivalvia): a new genus and species from Lake Poso, Indonesia. Hydrobiologia, 389: 131-139
 Suzuki, K.; Oyama, K. (1943). Überblick über die Corbiculiden Ostasiens (Materialien zur Monographic der Ostasiatischen Corbiculiden 1). Venus. 12(3-4): 138-149.
 Ota, Y. [Ohta, Y.]. (1970). A review of some Cretaceous corbiculids in North America. Transactions and Proceedings of the Palaeontological Society of Japan, new series. 79: 291-315.

Further reading
 Alexei V. Korniushin, Matthias Glaubrecht (2003) Novel reproductive modes in freshwater clams: brooding and larval morphology in Southeast Asian taxa of Corbicula (Mollusca, Bivalvia, Corbiculidae) Acta Zoologica 84 (4), 293–315. https://doi.org/10.1046/j.1463-6395.2003.00150.x
 (Redescription) Coan, E. V.; Valentich-Scott, P. (2012). Bivalve seashells of tropical West America. Marine bivalve mollusks from Baja California to northern Peru. 2 vols, 1258 pp.

External links
 von Mühlfeld J.C. (1811). Entwurf eines neuen Systems der Schaltiergehäuse. Magazin für die neuesten Entdecklungen in der gesammten Naturkunde von der Gesellschaft Naturforschaft Freunde zu Berlin. 5(1): 38-72, plate 3
 Dall, W. H. (1903). Review of the classification of the Cyrenacea. Proceedings of the Biological Society of Washington. 16: 5-8.
 Lindholm W.A. (1933). Eine verschollene Muschel aus Zentralasien. Archiv für Molluskenkunde. 65: 264–268
 Sandberger, C.L.F. (1870-1875). Die Land- und Süßwasser-Conchylien der Vorwelt. C. W. Kreidel, Wiesbaden.

Cyrenidae
Bivalve genera